is an international school in Kita-ku, Osaka, Japan. Osaka YMCA International School (OYIS) is an English-based, private international school, offering preschool to grade 12. The school year starts at the beginning of September and goes to the beginning of July–a fall-spring calendar. OYIS began operations in 2001 and received gakko hojin (private school) status from the Osaka prefectural government in 2012. OYIS has a high school program that includes the International Baccalaureate (IB) Diploma Program (DP) which leads to grade 12 graduation. OYIS is currently accredited by the International Baccalaureate Organization (IB) and by the US-based Western Association of Schools and Colleges (WASC).

History
The school was established in September 2001 from a partnership of Osaka city and the YMCA. In 2002 Alex Stewart of The Journal of the American Chamber of Commerce in Japan wrote that "Osaka city, at least, seems to have woken up to the importance of Osaka YMCA International School."

Student body
William A. Fischel, author of Making the Grade: The Economic Evolution of American School Districts, stated that a version of the OYCS website which had names of students, "at least half of which suggest Japanese parentage", made him conclude that OYIS was not only for North American families.

References

External links

 Osaka YMCA International School

Elementary schools in Japan
International Baccalaureate schools in Japan
International schools in Osaka
2001 establishments in Japan
Educational institutions established in 2001

Universities and colleges founded by the YMCA